This was the first edition of the tournament, primarily organised due to the cancellation of many tournaments during the 2020 season, because of the ongoing COVID-19 pandemic.

Aryna Sabalenka won the title, defeating Victoria Azarenka in the final, 6–2, 6–2. The final of this event was the first WTA singles final to be contested between two Belarusian players. Sabalenka won the title after being 6–0, 4–0 down, and facing break points to go 5–0 down, in her quarterfinal match against Sara Sorribes Tormo. After losing 10 games in a row, Sabalenka then won 12 games in a row.

Seeds
The top four seeds received a bye into the second round.

Draw

Finals

Top half

Bottom half

Qualifying

Seeds

Qualifiers

Qualifying draw

First qualifier

Second qualifier

Third qualifier

Fourth qualifier

Fifth qualifier

Sixth qualifier

References

External links
 Qualifying draw

2020 WTA Tour
2020 Singles
2020 in Czech tennis